The Taliban are a militant Islamist organisation, which have ruled Afghanistan several times in the last 30 years. As of October 2021, they have again taken control of the country, and established a form of government. As of late 2022, no country recognizes them as legitimate rulers, but de facto they are in control. This article is about the international relations with the Taliban.

Historic relations 
The Taliban are supported by several militant outfits which include the Haqqani network, Al-Qaeda and the Islamic Movement of Uzbekistan. Several countries like China, Iran, Pakistan, Qatar, Russia and Saudi Arabia allegedly support the Taliban. However, all of their governments deny providing any support to the Taliban. Likewise, the Taliban also deny receiving any foreign support from any country. At its peak, formal diplomatic recognition of the Taliban's government was acknowledged by three nations: Pakistan, Saudi Arabia, and the United Arab Emirates. In the past, the United Arab Emirates and Turkmenistan were also alleged to have provided support to the Taliban. It is designated by some countries as a terrorist organization.

During its time in power (1996–2001), at its height ruling 90% of Afghanistan, the Taliban régime, or "Islamic Emirate of Afghanistan", gained diplomatic recognition from only three states: the United Arab Emirates, Pakistan, and Saudi Arabia, all of which provided substantial aid. The most other nations and organizations, including the United Nations, recognised the government of the Islamic State of Afghanistan (1992–2002) (parts of whom were part of the United Front, also called Northern Alliance) as the legitimate government of Afghanistan. Regarding its relations with the rest of the world, the Taliban's Emirate of Afghanistan held a policy of isolationism: "The Taliban believe in non-interference in the affairs of other countries and similarly desire no outside interference in their country's internal affairs".

Traditionally, the Taliban were supported by Pakistan and Saudi Arabia, while Iran, Russia, Turkey, India, Uzbekistan, Kazakhstan, Kyrgyzstan, and Tajikistan formed an anti-Taliban alliance and supported the Northern Alliance. After the fall of the Taliban régime at the end of 2001, the composition of the Taliban supporters changed. According to a study by scholar Antonio Giustozzi, in the years 2005 to 2015 most of the financial support came from the states Pakistan, Saudi Arabia, Iran, China, and Qatar, as well as from private donors from Saudi Arabia, from al-Qaeda and, for a short period of time, from the Islamic State. About 54 percent of the funding came from foreign governments, 10 percent from private donors from abroad, and 16 percent from al-Qaeda and the Islamic State. In 2014, the amount of external support was close to $900 million.

Countries 

Since the Taliban took over the Afghan government, countries including China, Russia, and the United States have contacted Taliban representatives, but have expressed doubts about its commitment to counterterrorism. Border clashes between the Taliban forces with Pakistan, Iran and Turkmenistan have also caused friction with Afghanistan's neighbours. Taliban-led administration has set up a consortium of companies, including some in Russia, Iran and Pakistan, to create a investment plan focusing on power, mining and infrastructure in February 2023.

China 
While China has been supporting the new government in Kabul both financially and politically, it is believed to have unofficial relations with the Taliban Government according to Malek Setiz, international relations adviser to the Foreign Ministry of Afghanistan. Beijing's foreign ministry did not deny these interactions.

India 
India did not recognize the Taliban régime in Afghanistan. Instead, India maintained close strategic and military ties with the Northern Alliance so as to contain the rise of the Taliban during the 1990s. India was one of the closest allies of the former Afghan president Mohammad Najibullah and it strongly condemned his public execution by the Taliban. Pakistan and Kashmir-based militant groups which are thought to have ties with the Taliban have historically been involved in the Kashmir insurgency and they have frequently attacked Indian security forces.

In December 1999, Indian Airlines Flight 814 was hijacked and flown to Kandahar while it was en route from Kathmandu to Delhi. The Taliban moved its militias near the hijacked aircraft, supposedly to prevent Indian special forces from storming the aircraft, and they stalled the negotiations between India and the hijackers for several days. The New York Times later reported that there were credible links between the hijackers and the Taliban. As a part of the deal to free the plane, India released three militants. The Taliban granted the hijackers and the released militants safe passage.

Following the hijacking, India drastically increased its efforts to help Massoud, providing an arms depot in Dushanbe, Tajikistan. India also provided a wide range of high-altitude warfare equipment, helicopter technicians, medical services, and tactical advice. According to one report, Indian military support to anti-Taliban forces totalled US$70 million, including five Mil Mi-17 helicopters, and US$8 million worth of high-altitude equipment in 2001. India extensively supported the new administration in Afghanistan, leading several reconstruction projects and by 2001 had emerged as the country's largest regional donor.

In the wake of terrorist attacks in India, the Indian government has claimed that fundamentalist organisations such as the Taliban are seeking to expand their activities in India. During the 2011 ICC Cricket World Cup which was co-hosted in India, Pakistani Interior Minister Rehman Malik and Interpol chief Ronald Noble revealed that a terrorist bid to disrupt the tournament had been foiled; following a conference with Noble, Malik said that the Taliban had begun to base their activities in India with reports from neighbouring countries exposing their activities in the country and stating that a Sri Lankan terrorist who was planning to target cricketers was arrested in Colombo. In 2009, the Times of India called for India to reassess the Taliban threat.

In 2012, the Taliban said that they want to have cordial relations with India, and they praised India for resisting US calls for more military involvement in Afghanistan.

Iran 
Iran has historically been an enemy of the Taliban. In early August 1998, after attacking the city of Mazar-i-Sharif, Taliban forces killed several thousand civilians and 11 Iranian diplomats and intelligence officers in the Iranian consulate. Alleged radio intercepts indicate Mullah Omar personally approved the killings. In the following crisis between Iran and the Taliban, the Iranian government amassed up to 200,000 regular troops on the Afghan-Iranian border. War was eventually averted.

Many US senior military officials such as Robert Gates, Stanley McChrystal, David Petraeus and others believe that Iran's Islamic Revolutionary Guard Corps was involved in helping the Taliban to a certain extent during the first decade of the twenty-first century. Reports in which NATO states accused Iran of supplying and training some Taliban insurgents started coming forward since 2004/2005.

Several sources attest to an improving relationship between the Taliban and Iran during the 2010s. This included leadership changes within the Taliban itself: The Taliban's second emir, Mullah Akhtar Mansoor, particularly sought to expand ties with Iran, until he was killed by a U.S. drone strike on a return trip from Iran to Pakistan. Pro-Iran media outlets have also reported that the Taliban has included Shia Hazara fighters into its ranks. The Taliban have condemned Islamic State-linked attacks on the Hazara Shia minority. In August 2019, The Washington Post reported that Iran's "relationship with the Taliban now spans the economic, security and political realms and is likely to grow as the Taliban asserts itself again."

In August 2020, US intelligence officials assessed that Iran had offered bounties to the Taliban-linked Haqqani network to kill foreign servicemembers, including Americans, in Afghanistan in 2019. US intelligence determined that Iran paid bounties to Taliban insurgents for the 2019 attack on Bagram airport. According to CNN, Donald Trump's administration has "never mentioned Iran's connection to the bombing, an omission current and former officials said was connected to the broader prioritization of the peace agreement and withdrawal from Afghanistan."

In January 2020, the Taliban condemned the US killing of Iranian Quds Force commander Qasem Soleimani and hailed Soleimani as a "great warrior". However, in August 2021, Iran had to close its consulates as a result of the Taliban takeover of Kabul, but its embassy in Kabul remains open. Pro-Taliban stance among Iranian Principlists sparks rift with other Iranians. In 6 September, Iran's Foreign Ministry spokesman Saeed Khatibzadeh strongly condemned the Taliban assault on the Panjshir Valley.

Pakistan 

Maulana Fazal-ur-Rehman, leader of the Pakistani Islamic (Deobandi) political party Jamiat Ulema-e Islam (F) (JUI), was an ally of Benazir Bhutto, Pakistani prime minister in 1993–1996, and then had access to the Pakistani government, army and the ISI, whom he influenced to help the Taliban. The Pakistani Inter-Services Intelligence (ISI) has since 1994 heavily supported the Taliban, while the group conquered most of Afghanistan in 1994–98.

Human Rights Watch writes, "Pakistani aircraft assisted with troop rotations of Taliban forces during combat operations in late 2000 and ... senior members of Pakistan's intelligence agency and army were involved in planning military operations." Pakistan provided military equipment, recruiting assistance, training, and tactical advice. Officially Pakistan denied supporting the Taliban militarily.

Author Ahmed Rashid claims that the Taliban had "unprecedented access" among Pakistan's lobbies and interest groups. He also writes that they at times were able to "play off one lobby against another and extend their influence in Pakistan even further". By 1998–99, Taliban-style groups in Pakistan's Pashtun belt, and to an extent in Pakistan-administered Kashmir, "were banning TV and videos ... and forcing people, particularly women, to adapt to the Taliban dress code and way of life."

After the attacks of 11 September 2001, and the US operation in Afghanistan the Afghan Taliban leadership is claimed to have fled to Pakistan where they regrouped and created several shuras to coordinate their insurgency in Afghanistan.

Afghan officials implied the Pakistani ISI's involvement in a July 2008 Taliban attack on the Indian embassy. Numerous US officials have accused the ISI of supporting terrorist groups including the Afghan Taliban. US Defense Secretary Robert Gates and others suggest the ISI maintains links with groups like the Afghan Taliban as a "strategic hedge" to help Islamabad gain influence in Kabul once US troops exit the region.
US Chairman of the Joint Chiefs of Staff Admiral Mike Mullen in 2011 called the Haqqani network (the Afghan Taliban's most destructive element) a "veritable arm of Pakistan's ISI".

From 2010, a report by a leading British institution also claimed that Pakistan's intelligence service still today has a strong link with the Taliban in Afghanistan. Published by the London School of Economics, the report said that Pakistan's Inter-Services Intelligence agency (ISI) has an "official policy" of support for the Taliban. It said the ISI provides funding and training for the Taliban, and that the agency has representatives on the so-called Quetta Shura, the Taliban's leadership council. It is alleged that the Quetta Shura is exiled in Quetta. The report, based on interviews with Taliban commanders in Afghanistan, was written by Matt Waldman, a fellow at Harvard University.

"Pakistan appears to be playing a double-game of astonishing magnitude," the report said. The report also linked high-level members of the Pakistani government with the Taliban. It said Asif Ali Zardari, the Pakistani president, met with senior Taliban prisoners in 2010 and promised to release them. Zardari reportedly told the detainees they were only arrested because of American pressure. "The Pakistan government's apparent duplicity – and awareness of it among the American public and political establishment – could have enormous geopolitical implications," Waldman said. "Without a change in Pakistani behaviour it will be difficult if not impossible for international forces and the Afghan government to make progress against the insurgency." Afghan officials have long been suspicious of the ISI's role. Amrullah Saleh, the former director of Afghanistan's intelligence service, told Reuters that the ISI was "part of a landscape of destruction in this country".

Pakistan, at least up to 2011, has always strongly denied all links with Taliban.

On 15 June 2014 Pakistan army launches operation 'Zarb-e-Azb' in North Waziristan to remove and root-out Taliban from Pakistan. In this operation 327 hardcore terrorists had been killed while 45 hideouts and 2 bomb making factories of terrorists were destroyed in North Waziristan Agency as the operation continues.

Saudi Arabia 
Saudi Arabia has been accused of supporting Taliban. In a December 2009 diplomatic cable to US State Department staff (made public in the diplomatic cable leaks the following year), US Secretary of State Hillary Clinton urged US diplomats to increase efforts to block money from Gulf Arab states from going to terrorists in Pakistan and Afghanistan, writing that "Donors in Saudi Arabia constitute the most significant source of funding to Sunni terrorist groups worldwide" and that "More needs to be done since Saudi Arabia remains a critical financial support base for al-Qaeda, the Taliban, LeT and other terrorist groups."

Turkey 
Turkey has designated Afghan Taliban as a terrorist organization. Amid the US withdrawal from Afghanistan in 2021 Turkish president Recep Tayyip Erdoğan stated during the Brussel's NATO summit on 14 June that Turkey was willing to secure Hamid Karzai International Airport of Kabul, which is considered to play a vital role in maintaining stability and an international presence in Afghanistan. The Taliban has warned Turkey of "severe consequences" if its military remains in Afghanistan when other foreign forces pull out. In July 2021 Zabiullah Mujahid, a Taliban spokesman stated that Taliban wanted "normal ties" with Turkish government, but would consider Turkish forces as occupiers if they stay after the pull-out.

Qatar 

Qatar in 2013, with the approval of the US and the Afghan government, allowed the Afghan Taliban to set up a diplomatic and political office inside the country. This was done in order to facilitate peace negotiations and with the support of other countries.

Ahmed Rashid, writing in the Financial Times, stated that through the office Qatar has facilitated meetings between the Taliban and many countries and organisations, including the US state department, the UN, Japan, several European governments and non-governmental organisations, all of whom have been trying to push forward the idea of peace talks. In July 2017, Saudi Arabia, at the time in severe conflict with Qatar, without corroboration alleged Qatar to support terrorism including Taliban "armed terrorists".

In September 2017, the presidents of both the United States and Afghanistan demanded Qatar to close down the office of the Taliban. But in February 2020, Qatar facilitated the US–Taliban deal. According to the agreement, the Taliban would cut all its connections with Al-Qaeda and begin peace negotiations with the Afghani Government. In return the United States would begin the withdrawal of its troops.

Russia 
Russia has been accused of arming the Taliban by multiple politicians including Rex Tillerson and the Afghan government. There is no public evidence to substantiate such allegations, and several independent experts are sceptical that Russia materially supported the Taliban in any way. According to the BBC, Russia "is deeply concerned about the rise of Islamist fundamentalism in the region spreading in its direction, and it sees the Taliban as one potential bulwark against this."

In February and again in May 2019, a delegation of Taliban officials and senior Afghan politicians met in Moscow to hold a new round of Afghan peace talks. Reuters reported that "Russian officials as well as religious leaders and elders had asked for a ceasefire."

In June 2020, US intelligence officials assessed with medium confidence that the Russian GRU military-intelligence agency had offered bounties to the Taliban militants to kill coalition forces in Afghanistan. The Pentagon's top leaders said that Russian bounty program has not been corroborated.

United Kingdom 
After the 9/11 attacks, the United Kingdom froze the Taliban's assets in the UK, nearly $200 million by early October 2001. The UK also supported the US decision to remove the Taliban, both politically and militarily.

The UN agreed that NATO would act on its behalf, focusing on counter-terrorist operations in Afghanistan after the Taliban had been "defeated". The United Kingdom took operational responsibility for Helmand Province, a major poppy-growing province in southern Afghanistan, deploying troops there in mid-2006, and encountered resistance by re-formed Taliban forces allegedly entering Afghanistan from Pakistan. The Taliban turned towards the use of improvised explosive devices.

During 2008 the British government announced plans to pay Taliban fighters to switch sides or lay down their arms; the proceeding year they signalled their support of opening negotiations with the Taliban.

United States 

The United States never recognised the Taliban government in Afghanistan. Ahmed Rashid states that the US indirectly supported the Taliban through its ally in Pakistan between 1994 and 1996 because Washington viewed the Taliban as anti-Iranian, anti-Shia and potentially pro-Western. Washington furthermore hoped that the Taliban would support development planned by the US-based oil company Unocal. For example, it made no comment when the Taliban captured Herat in 1995, and expelled thousands of girls from schools. In late 1997, American Secretary of State Madeleine Albright began to distance the US from the Taliban, and the American-based oil company Unocal withdrew from negotiations on pipeline construction from Central Asia.

One day before the August 1998 capture of Mazar, bin Laden affiliates bombed two US embassies in Africa, killing 224 and wounding 4,500, mostly Africans. The US responded by launching cruise missiles on suspected terrorist camps in Afghanistan, killing over 20 though failing to kill bin Laden or even many Al-Qaeda. Mullah Omar condemned the missile attack and American President Bill Clinton. Saudi Arabia expelled the Taliban envoy in protest over the refusal to turn over bin Laden, and after Mullah Omar allegedly insulted the Saudi royal family. In mid-October the UN Security Council voted unanimously to ban commercial aircraft flights to and from Afghanistan, and freeze its bank accounts worldwide.

Adjusting its counterinsurgency strategy, in October 2009, the US announced plans to pay Taliban fighters to switch sides.

On 26 November 2009, in an interview with CNN's Christiane Amanpour, President Hamid Karzai said there is an "urgent need" for negotiations with the Taliban, and made it clear that the Obama administration had opposed such talks. There was no formal American response.

In December 2009, Asian Times Online reported that the Taliban had offered to give the US "legal guarantees" that they would not allow Afghanistan to be used for attacks on other countries, and that there had been no formal American response.

On 6 December, US officials indicated that they have not ruled out talks with the Taliban. Several days later it was reported that Gates saw potential for reconciliation with the Taliban, but not with Al-Qaeda. Furthermore, he said that reconciliation would politically end the insurgency and the war. But he said reconciliation must be on the Afghan government's terms, and that the Taliban must be subject to the sovereignty of the government.

In 2010, General McChrystal said his troop surge could lead to a negotiated peace with the Taliban.

In an interview with Palgrave Macmillan about relations between the US and the Taliban, American academic Dr. Jonathan Cristol argued that Taliban leaders "have been willing to negotiate, but from a position of relative strength and their goal is no longer a warm relationship with the US—that ship sailed long ago."

On 29 February 2020, the Trump administration signed a conditional peace agreement with the Taliban, which calls for the withdrawal of foreign troops in 14 months if the Taliban uphold the terms of the agreement. In March 2020, the US began a gradual withdrawal of its troops, to which they have agreed in a peace accord with the Taliban.

United Nations and NGOs 
Despite the aid of United Nations (UN) and non-governmental organisations (NGOs) given (see § Afghanistan during Taliban rule), the Taliban's attitude in 1996–2001 toward the UN and NGOs was often one of suspicion. The UN did not recognise the Taliban as the legitimate government of Afghanistan, most foreign donors and aid workers were non-Muslims, and the Taliban vented fundamental objections to the sort of 'help' the UN offered. As the Taliban's Attorney General Maulvi Jalil-ullah Maulvizada put it in 1997:

In July 1998, the Taliban closed "all NGO offices" by force after those organisations refused to move to a bombed-out former Polytechnic College as ordered. One month later the UN offices were also shut down.

Around 2000, the UN drew up sanctions against officials and leaders of Taliban, because of their harbouring Osama bin Laden. Several of the Taliban leaders have subsequently been killed.

In 2009, British Foreign Secretary Ed Miliband and US Secretary Hillary Clinton had called for talks with 'regular Taliban fighters' while bypassing their top leaders who supposedly were 'committed to global jihad'. Kai Eide, the top UN official in Afghanistan, called for talks with Taliban at the highest level, suggesting Mullah Omar—even though Omar had recently dismissed such overtures as long as foreign troops were in Afghanistan.

In 2010, the UN lifted sanctions on the Taliban, and requested that Taliban leaders and others be removed from terrorism watch lists. In 2010 the US and Europe announced support for President Karzai's latest attempt to negotiate peace with the Taliban.

Designation as a terrorist organization 

Officially, the Taliban is an illegal organization in several countries in 2022:

Former:  (2002–2015), but never on the United States Department of State list of Foreign Terrorist Organizations.

Militant outfits

Al-Qaeda 

In 1996, bin Laden moved to Afghanistan from Sudan. He came without invitation, and sometimes irritated Mullah Omar with his declaration of war and fatwas against citizens of third-party countries, but relations between the two groups improved over time, to the point that Mullah Omar rebuffed his group's patron Saudi Arabia, insulting Saudi minister Prince Turki while reneging on an earlier promise to turn bin Laden over to the Saudis.

Bin Laden was able to forge an alliance between the Taliban and al-Qaeda. The al-Qaeda-trained 055 Brigade integrated with the Taliban army between 1997 and 2001. Several hundred Arab and Afghan fighters sent by bin Laden assisted the Taliban in the Mazar-e-Sharif slaughter in 1998. From 1996 to 2001, the organisation of Osama Bin Laden and Ayman al-Zawahiri had become a virtual state within the Taliban state. The British newspaper The Telegraph stated in September 2001 that 2,500 Arabs under command of Bin Laden fought for the Taliban.

Taliban-al-Qaeda connections were also strengthened by the reported marriage of one of bin Laden's sons to Omar's daughter. While in Afghanistan, bin Laden may have helped finance the Taliban.

After the 1998 US embassy bombings in Africa, bin Laden and several al-Qaeda members were indicted in US criminal court. The Taliban rejected extradition requests by the US, variously claiming that bin Laden had "gone missing", or that Washington "cannot provide any evidence or any proof" that bin Laden was involved in terrorist activities and that "without any evidence, bin Laden is a man without sin... he is a free man."

Evidence against bin Laden included courtroom testimony and satellite phone records. Bin Laden, in turn, praised the Taliban as the "only Islamic government" in existence, and lauded Mullah Omar for his destruction of idols such as the Buddhas of Bamyan.

According to bin Laden, the Taliban were not involved in the 11 September attacks, stating in a tape sent to Al Jazeera: "I am the one responsible... The Afghan people and government knew nothing whatsoever about these events".

At the end of 2008, the Taliban was in talks to sever all ties with al-Qaeda.

In 2011, Alex Strick van Linschoten and Felix Kuehn at New York University's Center on International Cooperation claimed that the two groups did not get along at times before the 11 September attacks, and they have continued to fight since on account of their differences.

In July 2012, an anonymous senior-ranking Taliban commander stated that "Our people consider al-Qaeda to be a plague that was sent down to us by the heavens. Some even concluded that al-Qaeda are actually the spies of America. Originally, the Taliban were naive and ignorant of politics and welcomed al-Qaeda into their homes. But al-Qaeda abused our hospitality." He went on to further claim that about 70% of the Taliban are angry with al-Qaeda, revealing the icy relationship between the two groups.

Islamic State – Khorasan Province 

The Taliban has a negative relationship with the Islamic State – Khorasan Province. The IS started to actively recruit defectors from the Afghan Taliban, in particular, it recruited Afghan Taliban fighters who were disgruntled with their leaders because they lacked battlefield success. This prompted senior Taliban leader Akhtar Mansour to write a letter which was addressed to Abu Bakr al-Baghdadi and in that letter, Akhtar Mansour argued that the war in Afghanistan should be waged under the Taliban's's leadership and based on this argument, he asked Abu Bakr al-Baghdadi to order the IS to cease its recruitment drive in Afghanistan. Nevertheless, fighting between the two groups broke out in Nangarhar Province and in June 2015, ISIL was able to seize Afghan territory for the first time. In September 2015, ISIL drove the Taliban out of certain districts of Nangarhar after months of clashes.

In April 2016, the Taliban reported that in Nangarhar Province, a number of senior and mid-level leaders of Wilayah Khorasan had defected from ISIL and pledged allegiance to Taliban leader Akhtar Mansour. The defectors included members of the group's central council, judicial council and prisoners council as well as certain field commanders and fighters.

Malakand Taliban 
Malakand Taliban is a militant outfit led by Sufi Muhammad and his son in law Molvi Fazalullah. Sufi Muhammad is in Pakistani government custody; Molvi Fazalullah is believed to be in Afghanistan. In the last week of May 2011, eight security personnel and civilians fell victim to four hundred armed Taliban who attacked Shaltalo check post in Dir, a frontier District of Khyber Pakhtunkhwa, located a few kilometres away from the Afghan border. Although they have been linked with Waziristan-based Tehreek-e-Taliban Pakistan (TTP), the connection between these two groups was of a symbolic nature.

Tehrik-i-Taliban Pakistan (Pakistani Taliban) 

Before the creation of the Tehrik-i-Taliban (Pakistan), also denoted 'Tehrik e Taliban' some of their leaders and fighters were part of the 8,000 Pakistani militants fighting in the War in Afghanistan (1996–2001) and the War in Afghanistan (2001–2021) against the United Islamic Front and NATO forces. Most of them hail from the Pakistani side of the Af-Pak border regions. After the fall of the Afghan Taliban in late 2001 most Pakistani militants including members of today's TTP fled home to Pakistan.

After the creation of the Tehrik-i-Taliban Pakistan in 2007, headed by Baitullah Mehsud, its members have officially defined goals to establish their rule over Pakistan's Federally Administered Tribal Areas. They engage the Pakistani army in heavy combat operations. Some intelligence analysts believe that the TTP's attacks on the Pakistani government, police and army strained the TTP's relations with the Afghan Taliban.

The Afghan Taliban and the Tehrik-i-Taliban Pakistan differ greatly in their history, leadership and goals although they share a common interpretation of Islam and are both predominantly Pashtun. The Afghan Taliban have no affiliation with the Tehrik-i-Taliban Pakistan and routinely deny any connection to the TTP. The New York Times quoted a spokesman for the Afghan Taliban stating that:

It is alleged that Afghan Taliban relied on support by the Pakistani army in the past and are still supported by them today in their campaign to control Afghanistan. Regular Pakistani army troops allegedly fought alongside the Afghan Taliban in the War in Afghanistan (1996–2001). Major leaders of the Afghan Taliban including Mullah Omar, Jalaluddin Haqqani and Siraj Haqqani are believed to enjoy or have enjoyed safe haven in Pakistan. In 2006 Jalaluddin Haqqani was allegedly called a 'Pakistani asset' by a senior official of Inter-Services Intelligence. Pakistan denies any links with Haqqani or other terrorist groups. Haqqani himself has denied any links with Pakistan as well.

Afghan Taliban leader Mullah Omar asked the Tehrik-i-Taliban Pakistan in late 2008 and early 2009 to stop attacks inside Pakistan, to change their focus as an organisation and to fight the Afghan National Army and ISAF forces in Afghanistan instead. In late December 2008 and early January 2009 he sent a delegation, led by former Guantanamo Bay detainee Mullah Abdullah Zakir, to persuade leading members of the TTP to put aside differences with Pakistan.

Some regional experts state the common name "Taliban" may be more misleading than illuminating.
Gilles Dorronsoro, a scholar of South Asia currently at the Carnegie Endowment for International Peace in Washington says:

As the Pakistani Army began offensives against the Pakistani Taliban, many unfamiliar with the region thought incorrectly that the assault was against the Afghan Taliban of Mullah Omar which was not the case.

The Pakistani Taliban were put under sanctions by UN Security Council for terrorist attacks in Pakistan and the 2010 Times Square car bombing attempt.

References

Bibliography 

 
 
 
 

International relations
Taliban
Politics of Afghanistan